Professor John Downing (1922–1987) was a British educational psychologist who started his career as a teacher then worked as an academic from 1960 until his death in 1987.  He published over 300 academic papers in his 27 year academic career, specialising in both how children read and how they learn to read. His three main fields of study were the initial teaching alphabet, the psychology of reading and the comparison of reading methods across different languages and cultures. His principle works in each of these fields were Evaluating the Initial Teaching Alphabet, Reading & Reasoning and Comparative Reading.  Fundamentally, Downing was an educational psychologist and his main lifetime achievement was the formulation of the cognitive clarity theory of learning to read.

Downing won multiple accolades for his work, including the award of Doctor of Literature by the University of London near the end of his career.  He was elected a fellow of the British, Canadian and American Psychology Learned Societies & Associations and as a fellow to the Royal Society for Arts. In 1963, Downing was the founding president of the United Kingdom Literacy Association, he also served on the board of directors of the International Literacy Association, who awarded him with the International Citation of Merit and inducted him into their Hall of Fame. The government called on Downing to give evidence to both the Plowden and Bullock committees of inquiry.

Personal life 
Downing was born in England in 1922 and married Marianne Downing who often took on the role of his research assistant.  They had three children together: - Andrew Downing, Charles Downing and Rupert Downing. He emigrated from England to Canada in 1970 but  spent several periods of time working in other parts of the world, especially the United States of America.

Downing was known for his trademark dress code in which he wore bold check jackets with unusual bootlace badge ties, fashion characteristics which contrasted with his kind, quiet and scholarly manner. He had a couple of personal traits which endeared him to most of his colleagues and allowed him to form many enduring friendships. On initial introduction to new people, he had the uncanny ability to remember their names and where they both lived and worked, he also was quick and magnanimous in giving recognition to his colleagues and finally he was generous in providing assistance to his colleagues, altogether he was known as someone with a perpetually friendly manner.

After a 3 month struggle with cancer over the spring of 1987, Downing eventually succumbed to his illness and died on June 2, 1987, aged 65.

Education 
Downing continually improved his education throughout his life, while interspersing his learning with professional and academic work. He attained his teaching certificate in his twenties, his degree in his thirties, his PhD in his forties and was finally awarded the higher doctoral degree of D.Lit (Doctor of Literature) in his sixties as an acknowledgment of his academic successes by the University of London.

Classroom teaching 
After starting his teacher training in 1947, Downing spent nearly a decade until 1957 acquiring practical experience in teaching children at elementary, secondary and special schools, in particular, he taught children to read and write from kindergarten age, Downing considered this experience essential in his later works and often stated how he was often baffled by children's difficulties in learning to read.  Downing also studied for his degree in Psychology during the later period of his teaching career and only ended his teaching career after successfully completing his degree course.

Professional vocation 
After graduating Downing left teaching and worked as a communications research officer for Unilever in England between 1958 and 1960. This was a short interlude between his teaching and academic work.

Academic career 
In 1960, after his time at Unilever, Downing returned to the University of London and joined the Institute of Education where he took-up the newly formed role of director of the reading research unit.  The reading research unit was created to run a trial of James Pitman's initial teaching alphabet, a novel approach to teaching children to read where an interim orthography, consisting of an alternative alphabet and regular spelling system were used instead of the irregular traditional English orthography.  Downing spent seven years in the role, studying the initial teaching alphabet, he was to credit this key time as providing him with the crucial insights which inspired the majority of his later academic work.  It was during this time that Downing attained his PhD and both began to be known as Dr. John Downing and became a senior lecturer of Educational Psychology.

In 1970, Downing took up the post of Professor of Psychological Foundations in Education at Victoria University, British Columbia, Canada, which he held until his death. It was during this time, following his emigration to Canada, that he produced some of his most significant academic works.

Three times during his career, Downing took up positions of some longevity as a visiting professor:-

 1967–1968 – Visiting professor, University of California, Berkeley, where he taught the course on the psychology of reading and worked with masters and doctoral students researching this topic.  Downing accredited this period of time as when the seeds of the cognitive clarity theory of learning to read were sown in his mind.
 1981-1981 – Visiting professor, Ohio State University at Columbus
 1986–1987 – Visiting professor, Universite de Toulouse-le-Mirail

In addition, Downing also served as a visiting professor for shorter durations in Australia, China, Finland and the Soviet Union.  This was especially important later in his career for his study of comparative reading which also notably took him to Japan & Papua New Guinea as a researcher.

Initial Teaching Alphabet

Reading research unit 
As the director of the reading research unit, Downing spent seven years studying the initial teaching alphabet designed by James Pitman to teach children to read.  He was amply supported by the fourteen colleagues in the reading research unit, in particular his deputy William Latham who was accredited in some of the academic publications.  The unit was further supplemented by seven senior lecturers from educational colleges who served one-year secondments on a rotating basis. During his time at the reading research unit, Downing carried out two scientifically controlled, largescale trials of the initial teaching alphabet: -

 1961 - Twenty four local education authorities participated with 873 pupils being taught over 3 academic years using the i.t.a. compared with the same number of matched pupils who acted as the control.
 1963 - Sixteen schools participated with 548 pupils being taught over 3 academic years using the i.t.a. compared with 554 pupils who acted as the control.

Academic works 
Downing published a large body of academic work related to the initial teaching alphabet both whilst he was the director of the reading research unit and afterwards when he became a professor, this is comprehensively listed in his vitae, the more notable papers are listed below: -

In addition, Downing published five books on the initial teaching alphabet: -

 1962 – The Initial Teaching Alphabet – Explained and Illustrated
 1965 – The Initial Teaching Alphabet Reading Experiment – Three Lectures on the Research in Beginning Reading with Sir James Pitman's Initial Teaching Alphabet
 1966 – An Experimental Study of Orthography and Reading Attainments in English
 1967 – The i.t.a. Symposium: Research Report on the British Experiment with i.t.a.
 1967 – Evaluating the Initial Teaching Alphabet – A study of the influence of English orthography on learning to read and write, it was this book which was the final culmination of all his research efforts.

Children's literature 
The initial teaching alphabet started being taught using existing basal reading schemes transliterated into i.t.a. but originally designed specifically around the nuances of traditional orthography, such as the Janet & John series of reading books. To remediate this, Downing wrote the Downing Readers which were designed specifically for the i.t.a. and these were all published in the 1960s, although eventually, there were several authors for the Downing readers, Downing was the accredited author of the following: -

Downing's conclusion 
By the end of his study, Downing's principle conclusion on the initial teaching alphabet (i.t.a.) was: - "i.t.a. as a transitional writing-system for beginning reading and writing in English generally produces superior results in traditional orthography reading and spelling by the end of third year of school"

Psychology of reading 
After leaving his role as director of the reading research unit and taking up post as professor of psychological foundations in education at Victoria University, Downing built on his i.t.a. work by focusing on children's thought processes in learning to read, to this end he developed the cognitive clarity theory of learning to read, which was his crowning achievement as an educational psychologist.  Much of Downing's later work was either the application of the theory or studies through the lens of the theory. As well as publishing a large number of academic papers, Downing's major academic works in this area of research were: -

 1971 - Reading Readiness, published originally by the University of London Press
 1979 – Reading and Reasoning, published originally by Chambers  and Springer-Verlag
 1982 - Psychology of Reading, published originally by Macmillan
 1983 – Linguistic Awareness in Reading Readiness (LARR) Test: Recognizing literacy behaviour, a test published originally by NFER-Nelson
 1984 – Language Awareness and Learning to Read,  published originally by Springer-Verlag
An interesting example of the application of the cognitive clarity theory of learning to read is the Young Set Dictionaries which Downing co-authored. The theory suggests that children have their own vocabulary of words which they desire to read and write rather than the vocabulary which adults desire to teach them.  The mis-match often caused difficulties in learning to read, as such Downing co-compiled a multi-stage dictionary of words which children desired to be in their dictionaries: -

 Chambers Young Set Dictionary One (160 words for ages 4-5)
 Chambers Young Set Dictionary Two (1,000 words for ages 6-7)
 Chambers Young Set Dictionary Three (5,000 words for ages 8-9)
 Chambers Young Set Dictionary Four (15,000 words for ages 10-11)

Comparative reading 
Downing's study of the initial teaching alphabet provided insight into how a language's linguistic characteristics and orthography could influence how children learn to read, as such he explored and compared learning to read in different languages and effectively launched a brand new field of study "comparative reading" named after his original academic work on this subject where he compared reading across 14 countries: - Comparative Reading – Cross-national Studies of Behavior and Processes in Reading and Writing.

Downing described the three aims of this field of study: -

 Identify the universal psychological characteristics in the acquisition of reading skills across the world by taking into account the differences caused by languages, orthographies and school systems.
 Catalogue, classify and assess how people read and learn to read in different languages and cultures.
 Socialise out, the rich variety of successful teaching methods used by different societies which are often unknown outside of their own language.

As an example, one of Downing's early academic papers was on the use of Japanese Furigana as a teaching aid, this was published in the journal Forward Trends on 15th October 1971.

Downing continued to compare how reading was taught in different countries through the lens of his theory all the way to his death in 1987.  One of his last researches was in Papua New Guinea which had over 800 spoken languages, so it was a natural laboratory for his final work. He titled his work;- "Experiments in Linguistics and Literacy in Papua New Guinea" (1986).

Career highlights 
The major academic highlights of John Downing's career were: –

Notable speeches 
Downing made eight keynote addresses to the bi-annual international congress on reading held by UNESCO and the International Reading Association, now known as the International Literacy Association: -
 1966 – 1st International Congress on Reading in Paris
 1972 – 4th International Congress on Reading in Buenos Aires
 1974 – 5th International Congress on Reading in Vienna
 1976 – 6th International Congress on Reading in Singapore
 1978 – 7th International Congress on Reading in Hamburg
 1982 – 9th International Congress on Reading in Dublin
 1984 – 10th International Congress on Reading in Hong Kong
 1986 – 11th International Congress on Reading in London

United Kingdom and international reading associations 
In 1963, Downing became the founding president of the United Kingdom Reading Association, now known as the United Kingdom Literacy Association.

He also held several prominent roles with its sister organisation, the International Literacy Association, who awarded him with the International Citation of Merit in 1984.  Downing's roles for the International Literacy Association were: -

 On the board of directors
 Chairman of the special interest group for international co-operation in research and development in reading
 Chairman of the special interest group for the language-experience approach
 Chairman of committee on voluntary service for literacy in third world countries
 Member of international development committee
 Member of the  committee on comparative reading
 Member of several bi-annual congress programs: -
 1974–1976, Singapore world congress
 1982–1984, French language reading
 1982–1984, Multi-literacy in multi-cultural settings
 1983–1984, German language reading

 In 1987, Downing was inducted onto the Reading Hall of Fame, an affiliated organisation of the International Literacy Association.

Government inquiries

1967 – Plowden inquiry 
As one of the leading experts on the initial teaching alphabet, Downing gave written and in-person evidence to the influential Plowden inquiry 'to consider primary education in all its aspects and the transition to secondary education'. Paragraph 588 of the report describes the committee's resulting thoughts on the subject of the initial teaching alphabet: - "588. A hundred and fifty years ago, Coleridge, anxious about his own child's progress in reading, complained about 'our lying alphabet'. How great an obstacle is it to children who have difficulty in learning to read? The Initial Teaching Alphabet has attracted great public attention and has been the subject of heated argument. Should the claims made for the use of this alphabet be substantiated, it would mean that all but a small minority of those children who find reading difficult would find it so no longer. Since at present a substantial minority find difficulty, the claims merit careful scrutiny."

1975 – Bullock inquiry 

By 1975, Downing, as an expert in teaching children to read & write, gave evidence to the Bullock inquiry into the teaching in schools of reading and the other uses of English.  There were two broad areas where Downing's expertise was sought: -

 Firstly, the committee was concerned that the country may be falling behind others in levels of literacy, also the committee sought to identify good practices in other countries on difficult subjects such as the organisation of schooling.  For both these reasons, Downing was consulted as an expert in the field of comparative reading between different countries.
 Secondly, the merits of the initial teaching alphabet were considered by the committee and Downing as the leading expert in the field, was consulted.   The committee referred back to the evidence from the original largescale scientific  studies carried out by Downing: -
"7.29 ... When groups of t.o. and i.t.a. children were matched in the main British experiments, the writing produced by the latter was of consistently higher quality. (Downing and Latham subsequently tested a sample of the children originally involved in this experiment and found that the i.t.a. pupils remained superior in t.o. reading and spelling even after five years at school, i.e. well beyond the transition stage)."

Simplified Spelling Society 

Downing replaced James Pitman, who was the founder of the initial teaching alphabet, as chairman of the simplified spelling society in 1972, a post he was to hold until his death. After his death, the society published the following obituary in its journal: -  "John Downing carried out the crucial scientific research which not merely demonstrated how and why the initial teaching alphabet was educationally so superior to traditional orthography, but also provided solid evidence to support the Society's message that the level of literacy would benefit from improvements in English spelling."

Awards and recognitions 
Downing received recognition for his distinguished contributions in the field of educational psychology: -

 1973 - Elected as a Fellow of the British Psychological Society
 1975 - Elected as a Fellow of the Royal Society of the Arts
 1978 - Elected as a Fellow of the American Psychological Association
 1981 - Elected as a Fellow of the Canadian Psychological Association
 1987 - Elected as a Honorary Life Fellow of the Canadian Psychological Association

Footnotes

Citations

References 

 
 
 
 
 
 
 
 
 
 

1922 births
1987 deaths
British educational theorists
British psychologists
Educational psychologists
Alumni of the University of London
20th-century British psychologists
Academics of the University of London
Fellows of the British Psychological Society
Fellows of the American Psychological Association